Palmer Archipelago, also known as Antarctic Archipelago, Archipiélago Palmer, Antarktiske Arkipel or Palmer Inseln, is a group of islands off the northwestern coast of the Antarctic Peninsula.
It extends from Tower Island in the north to Anvers Island in the south. It is separated by the Gerlache and Bismarck straits from the Antarctic Peninsula and Wilhelm Archipelago, respectively.

History
Adrien de Gerlache, leader of the Belgian Antarctic Expedition (1897–1899), discovered the archipelago in 1898.  He named it Archipelago Palmer for American Captain Nathaniel Palmer, who navigated these waters in 1820.

Both Argentina and the United Kingdom have operated research stations there.

Islands
The archipelago includes:

Gallery

See also

References

External links 

 
Archipelagoes of the Southern Ocean
Argentine Antarctica
British Antarctic Territory
Islands of Antarctica